Arthrostylidium longiflorum is a species of Arthrostylidium bamboo in the grass family.

Distribution 
Arthrostylidium longiflorum is native to Venezuela in South America

References

longiflorum
Flora of Venezuela